Adoration of the Shepherds is a c. 1668 oil on canvas painting by Bartolomé Esteban Murillo, his second surviving work on that subject after a c.1650 version. It is held at the Wallace Collection, in London.

References

1668 paintings
Murillo
Paintings in the Wallace Collection
Paintings by Bartolomé Esteban Murillo